The Cavalla River (also known as the Cavally, the Youbou and the Diougou) is a river in West Africa running from north of Mont Nimba in Guinea, through Côte d'Ivoire, to Zwedru in Liberia, and back to the border with Côte d'Ivoire. It forms the southern two-thirds of the international boundary between Liberia and Côte d'Ivoire.

The name is derived from the cavalla horse mackerel found at its mouth. It is home to the endemic Chiloglanis normani.

References

External links

World River Discharge Database

Rivers of Liberia
Rivers of Ivory Coast
Rivers of Guinea
International rivers of Africa
Ivory Coast–Liberia border
Border rivers